Michael Greco may refer to:

Michael Greco (actor) (born 1970), British actor and poker player
Michael S. Greco (born 1942), former president of the American Bar Association
Michael Greco (police officer), United States Marshal for the Southern District of New York

See also 
Michael Grecco (born 1968), American photographer